The Australian Senior Open was an event on the PGA Legends Tour. It was run by Golf Australia. From 2007 to 2012 it was hosted by ISPS Handa and titled as the Handa Australian Senior Open. The final event was in 2012. The 2010 event was co-sanctioned with the European Senior Tour and was the first event of the 2011 European Senior Tour season.

Winners

References

External links
Golf Australia website 
Coverage of the 2010 tournament on the European Senior Tour's official site

Golf tournaments in Australia